June Richmond (July 9, 1915 in Chicago, Illinois – August 14, 1962 in Gothenburg, Sweden) was an American jazz singer and actor.

June Richmond is considered the first African-American jazz singer who sang regularly in a white band when she appeared in 1938, with Jimmy Dorsey's Orchestra, with whom she recorded several sides for Decca Records. She had previously worked in Les Hite's band in California, and after her time at Dorsey she joined Cab Calloway (1938), with whom she recorded for Vocalion Records, and then worked from 1939 to 1942 in Andy Kirk's orchestra, again recording for Decca. After she left Kirk, she launched a successful career as a soloist; In 1946, she had a featured role in the Broadway musical Are You With It? In 1948 she appeared mostly in Europe. She first settled in France, where she sang worked with Henri Renaud, and later in Scandinavia.

Her first recordings under her own name originated in 1945 when she signed with Mercury Records, releasing several singles, including two songs from her Broadway musical "Are You With It?"  She then moved to Europe, where she recorded six titles in Stockholm with Svend Asmussen. In 1957, in Paris, she recorded another four numbers with the orchestra of Quincy Jones, "I Gotta Right to Sing the Blues", "Sleep", "Everybody's Doing It" and "Between the Devil and the Deep Blue Sea". She also recorded a series of 45 EP albums for the Odeon, Barclay and Varga labels and a 10" LP of eight songs from Porgy and Bess sung in French.  

She appeared in several films in the 1940s and 1950s, including Murder in Swingtime (1937), Carolina Blues (1944), Reet, Petite, and Gone (1947), The Dreamer (1948), Tour of the Grand Dukes (France, 1953), and Liebe, Jazz und Übermut (Germany, 1957). 
 
June Richmond died of a heart attack in 1962 at the age of 47. A comprehensive two-disc CD collection, Hey, Lawdy Mama! was released in 2022 by Jasmine Records.

Discography 
 Cab Calloway,  1938-1939 (Classics)
 Andy Kirk, 1939-1940, 1943-1949 (Classics)
 Harold Nicholas, June Richmond, Andy Bey, Jazz in Paris (Gitanes/Universal, 2000)
 June Richmond--Hey Lawdy Mama! Rare Recordings 1938-1961 (Jasmine)
 June Richmond Chante en Francais (Ild)
 June Richmond Chante en Anglais (Ild)
 June Richmond Chante Porgy and Bess en Francais (Odeon)
 Andy Kirk and June Richmond, New Orleans Jump (Sounds of Yesteryear)

References

Sources
 Bielefelder Katalog 1988 & 2002
 Richard Cook & Brian Morton: The Penguin Guide to Jazz Recordings, 8th Edition, London, Penguin, 2006; 
 Leonard Feather and Ira Gitler, The Biographical Encyclopedia of Jazz. Oxford/New York, 1999; 
 Will Friedwald: Swinging Voices of America - Ein Kompendium großer Stimmen. Hannibal, St. Andrä-Wördern, 1992;

External links 
  Biography by Scott Yanow for Allmusic
 

1915 births
1962 deaths
American women jazz singers
American jazz singers
20th-century American singers
20th-century American women singers